Azam Warsak is a village located in Birmal Tehsil, which is located approximately 20 kilometers west of Wanna.

See also 

 Datta Khel
 Kaniguram
 Jandola

References

Populated places in Khyber Pakhtunkhwa